Radoslav Mihaljević (1426–d. 1436) was a Serbian magnate (velikaš) in the service of Despots Stefan Lazarević (r. 1402–27) and Đurađ Branković (r. 1427–56), with the title of veliki vojvoda. He is mentioned in 1426 alongside čelnik Radič, protovestijar Bogdan and logotet Voihna. He is believed to have founded the ruined church in Radošin near Svilajnac during Despot Stefan's reign. He died in 1436.

References

Additional sources

15th-century Serbian nobility
People of the Serbian Despotate
Medieval Serbian magnates
1436 deaths
14th-century deaths
Medieval Serbian military leaders